Renzo De Vecchi (3 February 1894 – 14 May 1967) was an Italian football player and coach who played as a defender. He competed in the 1912 Summer Olympics with Italy, and is officially the youngest player to have ever played a match for the Italy national side. Regarded as one of Italy's greatest ever players, he was known for his excellent technique, dribbling skills, and his accuracy from penalty kicks, despite being a defender. As a ball-winning full-back, he was known for his strength, tackling ability, anticipation, and his organisational skills on the left flank, and was also capable of playing in the centre or in midfield.

Club career
Born in Milan, Renzo De Vecchi is the youngest player to play in a Serie A game for A.C. Milan, making his debut at 15 years and 284 days, on 14 November 1909, in a 2–1 home win over Ausonia. He soon becoming a member of the starting line-up on the left side of the back-line, although he was also capable of playing in the centre or even in midfield. Due to his class and playing ability, he was given the nickname "Il Figlio di Dio" (The Son of God) by the Milan fans. He later moved to Genoa in 1913, winning three Italian League titles during his time with the club, before retiring in 1929. Between 1927 and 1929, he worked as a player-manager for Genoa, and during the 1929–30 season, after retiring as a player, he became the club's manager for a season, temporarily moving to Rapallo in 1930, for three seasons. He returned to Genoa in 1933, and he helped the club to gain Serie A promotion, winning the 1934–35 Serie B title, before retiring, after which he pursued a coaching career.

International career
De Vecchi is the youngest official player to feature in a match for the Italian national team at 16 years, three months and 23 days, making his international debut as a substitute on 26 May 1910, in a 6–1 away defeat to Hungary. As a member of the Italian Olympic squad in 1912, he played one match in the main tournament as well as two matches in the consolation tournament; he also represented Italy at the 1920 and 1924 Summer Olympic Games. He served as Italy's captain between 1920 and 1925. In total, he made 43 appearances for Italy between 1910 and 1925.

After retirement
Following his retirement as a manager, De Vecchi worked as a journalist for La Gazzetta dello Sport.

Honours

Player
Genoa
 Italian Football Championship: 1914–15, 1922–23, 1923–24

Coach
Genoa
 Serie B: 1934–35

References

External links
 
 Profile at Italia 1910 

1894 births
1967 deaths
Association football fullbacks
Italian footballers
A.C. Milan players
Italy international footballers
Olympic footballers of Italy
Footballers at the 1912 Summer Olympics
Footballers at the 1920 Summer Olympics
Footballers at the 1924 Summer Olympics
Italian football managers
Genoa C.F.C. managers
Genoa C.F.C. players
Italian sports journalists